A total of  athletes could qualify for judo at the 2020 Summer Olympics.  Each NOC could enter a maximum of 14 judokas (one in each division). Host nation Japan has reserved a spot in each of all 14 events, while twenty are made available to NOCs through a Tripartite Commission Invitation.

The remaining judoka underwent a qualifying process to earn a spot for the Games through the world ranking list prepared by International Judo Federation on June 28, 2021, and finalized on 5 July.

The top 18 athletes in each division directly qualify, though each NOC is subjected to a limit of 1 judoka per division. If the NOC contains more than a single athlete ranked in the top 18 of the world ranking list, the NOC can decide which of their athletes obtain the quota places.

Further continental quotas (13 men and 12 women for Europe, 12 of each gender for Africa, 10 men and 11 women for Pan America, 10 of each gender for Asia, and 5 of each gender for Oceania are also available. These quotas are assigned by creating a list of all athletes for each continent across all divisions and both genders. The top-ranked athletes qualify in turn, subject to the general rule of 1 athlete per NOC per division as well as the additional rule that each NOC may only qualify one judoka through the continental quotas (that is, ensuring that 100 different NOCs are represented through this qualification system).

Mixed team qualification was based on NOCs qualifying enough individual judokas across various divisions to have a six-person team meeting specific requirements (one man and one woman in each of three groups of divisions).

Qualification summary

Source:

Men's events

Extra-lightweight (60 kg) 
Source:

Half-lightweight (66 kg) 
Source:

Lightweight (73 kg) 
Source:

Half-middleweight (81 kg) 
Source:

Middleweight (90 kg) 
Source:

Half-heavyweight (100 kg) 
Source:

Heavyweight (+100 kg) 
as per June 14 2021
Source:

Women's events

Extra-lightweight (48 kg) 
Source:

Half-lightweight (52 kg) 
Source:

Lightweight (57 kg) 
Source:

Half-middleweight (63 kg) 
Source:

Middleweight (70 kg) 
Source:

Half-heavyweight (78 kg) 
Source:

Heavyweight (+78 kg) 
Source:

Continental quotas

Africa

 Men

 Women

America

 Men
                                       

 Women

Asia

 Men

 Women

Europe

 Men

 Women

Oceania

 Men

 Women

Mixed team
In order to qualify for mixed team competition, an NOC had to have individual competitors in each of six groups of divisions:

 Men's lower third (extra-lightweight, half-lightweight, or lightweight)
 Men's middle third (lightweight, half-middleweight, or middleweight)
 Men's upper third (middleweight, half-heavyweight, or heavyweight)
 Women's lower third (extra-lightweight, half-lightweight, or lightweight)
 Women's middle third (lightweight, half-middleweight, or middleweight)
 Women's upper third (middleweight, half-heavyweight, or heavyweight)

Male qualifiers

Female qualifiers

Notes

References

Qualification for the 2020 Summer Olympics
Qualification
2020
Olympics Qualification
Impact of the COVID-19 pandemic on the 2020 Summer Olympics